Darryl Marvin Olsen (born October 7, 1966) is a Canadian former professional ice hockey defenceman who played in one National Hockey League game for the Calgary Flames during the 1991–92 NHL season.

His son, Dylan Olsen, was drafted 28th overall by the Chicago Blackhawks during the 2009 NHL Entry Draft.

Awards and honors

See also
List of players who played only one game in the NHL

References

External links

1966 births
Living people
Calgary Flames draft picks
Calgary Flames players
Canadian expatriate ice hockey players in England
Canadian expatriate ice hockey players in Italy
Canadian expatriate ice hockey players in the United States
Canadian ice hockey defencemen
Denver Daredevils players
HC Gardena players
Houston Aeros (1994–2013) players
Northern Michigan Wildcats men's ice hockey players
Nottingham Panthers players
Phoenix Mustangs players
Providence Bruins players
Salt Lake Golden Eagles (IHL) players
San Diego Gulls (IHL) players
Ice hockey people from Calgary
AHCA Division I men's ice hockey All-Americans
Canadian expatriate ice hockey players in Austria
Canadian expatriate ice hockey players in Germany